Rachuonyo District was an administrative district in the Nyanza Province of Kenya. Its capital town was Kosele, and previously, Oyugis. The district had a population of 307,126 (1999 census) and an area of 945 km². The district had two constituencies, Kasipul Kabondo and Karachuonyo, which have been part of Homa Bay County since 2010.

Barack Obama Sr., the father of Barack Obama, the 44th President of the United States, was born in Rachuonyo District.

External links 
Map of the district

References 

 
Former districts of Kenya